Polemonium pauciflorum, the fewflower Jacob's-ladder, is a rare species of flowering plant in the phlox family found in the United States and Mexico.

References

External links
 
 

pauciflorum
Plants described in 1888